Simple Gearle is the debut solo album by Stacey Earle, released independently through Gearle Records. The back of the CD booklet lists the songs as if there were two sides, like on an old LP.

Track listing

Musicians
Stacey Earle: Vocals, Acoustic Guitar
Band: The Jewels (Michael Webb, John Gardener, Mark Prentice & Mark Stuart
Steve Earle: Harmony Vocals on track 7
Michael Webb: Accordion, Melodica, Mandolin
John Gardener: Drums, Percussion
Mark Prentice: Electric Bass, Fretless Bass, Upright Bass
Mark Stuart: Vocals, Acoustic Guitar
Andrea Zonn: Viola on track 13

Production
Stacey Earle & The Jewels: Producers
Paul Freeman: Assistant
Gena Kennedy: Graphic Design
Nathan Smith: Engineer, Mixing Engineer
Eric Wolf: Mastering

All track information and credits were taken from the CD liner notes.

References

External links
Stacey Earle Official Site

1999 albums